The European Athletics Team Championships (European Team Championships until 2013), is an international athletics competition organised by European Athletics, between different countries of Europe, over 4 leagues. It replaced in 2009 the former and similar European Cup (1965-2008). Unlike most international competitions, medals are not awarded to individuals in individual events but to the overall winning team on a points system.

History

The main idea of the cup, developed by Bruno Zauli, president of the European Committee of the International Association of Athletics Federations, was to create a competition for all European athletics federations, in which they would face each other in track and field events. Although Zauli died just a few months before the launch of the first event, the competition has gone from strength to strength.

In 2008, it was decided to change the competition and for it to take a new format with four leagues, which consist of 20 events for men and 20 for women. The Super League and the First League have 12 teams each, while the Second League and the Third League 8 and 14 respectively. Team scores will be calculated by combination of men and women's points, rather than the previous individual male and female scores. Each year, three teams are relegated from the Super League and are replaced by three teams promoted from the First League. Two teams are relegated/promoted among First, Second and Third League teams.

In 2018, it was decided to change again the competition format: the ETC will now be held every odd year, with a Super-League of 8 countries only, starting in 2021, and First and Second League of 12 countries. In the case of the host country is not qualified, a 9th country could compete in Super-League.

Editions

Host cities

Team summary (Super League)

1 (1) = participated in First League.
2 (2) = participated in Second League.

Medal table (Super League)
At the European Athletics Team Championships medals are not awarded, but with gold, silver and bronze conventionally refers to the top three finishes. 360 events (40 per edition) were disputed in 9 editions of the Super League from 2009 to 2021.

Championships records

Men

Women

References

External links
  Official website
 Statistics Handbook (2021)
 Team Championships Regulations

 
Recurring sporting events established in 2009
Team combination track and field competitions
Team
European international sports competitions
Biennial athletics competitions